Benedict Carl Whitby (born 1977), is a male former athlete who competed for England.

Athletics career
He became the British champion in 2001 and 2002 after winning the British 3,000 metres steeplechase title.

He represented England in the 3,000 metres steeplechase event, at the 1998 Commonwealth Games in Kuala Lumpur, Malaysia. Four years later he represented England again at the 2002 Commonwealth Games.

References

1977 births
Living people
English male steeplechase runners
Athletes (track and field) at the 1998 Commonwealth Games
Athletes (track and field) at the 2002 Commonwealth Games
Commonwealth Games competitors for England